Chris Forhan is a poet, memoirist, and professor at Butler University, author most recently, of My Father Before Me, published by Simon and Schuster. Each of his full-length poetry collections has won an award: Black Leapt In, The Actual Moon, The Actual Stars, and Forgive Us Our Happiness, which won the Barrow Street Press Poetry Prize, the Morse Poetry Prize, and Bakeless Prize, respectively.  

Forhan has had poems published in The Best American Poetry 2008, AGNI online, Poetry (magazine), Slate (magazine), and The Paris Review. He has received a fellowship from the National Endowment of the Arts and two Pushcart Prizes. He has also won the Washington State Book Award and the Best Book of Indiana Award. His books have been reviewed in Publishers Weekly, Kirkus Reviews, Library Journal, and New York Journal of Books. He has been interviewed by Superstition Review, Bellingham Review, and Midwestern Gothic.

Personal life
He was born and raised in Seattle, Washington. He is married to the poet Alessandra Lynch, and they live in Indianapolis with their sons.

Published works
Memoir
 My Father Before Me: A Memoir (Charles Scribner’s Sons, 2016)

Full-length Poetry Collections
 Black Leapt In (Barrow Street Press, 2009)
 The Actual Moon, the Actual Stars (Northeastern University Press, 2003)
 Forgive Us Our Happiness (University Press of New England, 1999)
Chapbook
 Ransack and Dance: Poems (Silver Birch Press, 2013)
 X: A Poem (Floating Bridge Press, 2000)
 Crumbs of Bread (March Street Press, 1995)

References

External links
Choosing Therapy 17 Best Books About Suicide for 2021
Poetry Foundation | Poets | Chris Forhan
National Endowment for the Arts | Creative Writing Fellows | 2007 Poetry | Chris Forhan
Chris Forhan Website
Poets & Writers Directory | Chris Forhan
Publishers Weekly | Book Review | My Father Before Me: A Memoir by Chris Forhan | 07/18/2016
Slate Poems by Chris Forhan
Superstition Review | Issue 18 | A Flat Figure: An Interview with Chris Forhan
Bellingham Review | Contributor Spotlight: Chris Forhan | May 2, 2018
Midwestern Gothic | Chris Forhan Interview | by Megan Valley | April 2017

Year of birth missing (living people)
Living people
American poets
Butler University faculty
Writers from Seattle
Poets from Washington (state)